USS John Finn (DDG-113) is an  in service with the United States Navy. The contract to build her was awarded to Ingalls Shipbuilding of Pascagoula, Mississippi, on 15 June 2011. Ingalls has been a subsidiary of Huntington Ingalls Industries (HII) since its acquisition in April 2001. On 15 February 2011, Secretary of the Navy Ray Mabus announced the ship's name to be John Finn after John William Finn, the first Medal of Honor recipient of World War II. He was so honored for machine-gunning Japanese warplanes for over two hours during the December 1941 attack on Pearl Harbor despite being shot in the foot and shoulder, and suffering numerous shrapnel wounds. He retired as a lieutenant after thirty years of service and died at age 100 in 2010.

Design
John Finn is the 63rd Arleigh Burke-class destroyer, the first of which, was commissioned in July 1991. With 89 ships planned to be built so far, the class has the longest production run for any U.S. Navy surface combatant. During its long production run, the class was built in three flights: Flight I (DDG-51 to DDG-71), Flight II/IIA/IIA T.I. (DDG-72 to DDG-124 & DDG-127), and Flight III (DDG-125, DDG-126 & DDG-128 to DDG-139). The Arleigh Burke-class was also the first in the U.S. Navy to include anti-NBC (Nuclear, Biological, and Chemical) warfare protection. John Finn will be a Flight IIA ship, and as such, will feature several improvements in terms of ballistic missile defense, an embarked air wing (two MH-60R Light Airborne Multi-Purpose System helicopters), and the inclusion of mine-detecting ability. As an Arleigh Burke-class ship, John Finns roles include anti-aircraft, anti-submarine, and anti-surface warfare, as well as strike operations.

Construction
In November 2013, John Finns keel was laid down at Ingalls Shipbuilding. The keel laying ceremony was attended by Laura Stavridis, the ship sponsor and former wife of retired Admiral James Stavridis. The ship was launched on 28 March 2015 and christened on 2 May 2015. On 7 December 2016, the 75th anniversary of the attack on Pearl Harbor, the ship was delivered to the U.S. Navy. The precommissioning crew moved on board the ship on 28 February 2017 and the vessel was commissioned on 15 July 2017 in Pearl Harbor, Hawaii, then homeported to San Diego, California.

History
On 17 November 2020, John Finn successfully intercepted an ICBM using a SM-3 Block IIA missile. The target missile was launched from the test site on the Kwajalein Atoll and simulated an attack on Hawaii. This was the first time that an ICBM had been successfully intercepted by an SM-3 and the first time a U.S. Navy ship had brought down such a missile.

Deployments
Maiden deployment December 2020 - April 2021

Awards
 Battle "E" – (2019), (2020), (2021)
 Navy Sea Service Deployment Ribbon - (2020)

References

External links

 

Arleigh Burke-class destroyers
2015 ships